Hathor 11 - Coptic Calendar - Hathor 13

The twelfth day of the Coptic month of Hathor, the third month of the Coptic year. On a common year, this day corresponds to November 8, of the Julian Calendar, and November 21, of the Gregorian Calendar. This day falls in the Coptic season of Peret, the season of emergence.

Commemorations

Feasts 

 Monthly commemoration of Archangel Michael

Saints 

 The departure of Saint John the Syrian

References 

Days of the Coptic calendar